Cubana de Aviación Flight 9046 was a chartered Ilyushin Il-62M airliner (registered CU-T1281) operated by Cubana, which crashed on 3 September 1989, shortly after takeoff from José Martí International Airport.

Flight 9046 was due to operate a non-scheduled international Havana–Milan–Cologne passenger service. The crash resulted in the deaths of all 126 occupants of the aircraft plus 24 people on the ground. It is the worst aviation disaster to have ever occurred in Cuba.

Accident
The crew retracted the flaps from their initial 30° position to 15°, in an attempt to gain speed, but this action reduced the ability of the wing to provide lift. All 126 people on board —115 passengers, most of them Italian holidaymakers, and a crew of 11— perished in the accident. An additional 24 people who were not aboard the aircraft also died as a result of the crash.

Cause
Investigators attributed the crash of Flight 9046 to the pilot's decision to fly after an abrupt deterioration in the meteorological conditions. The pilot underestimated the risks of taking off, and misjudged the aircraft's performance in poor weather.

Victims
115 passengers
11 crew members
24 neighbours

Only one of the passengers survived the crash initially. He lived for nine days but succumbed to his injuries nine days later.

See also

Cubana de Aviación accidents and incidents

Notes

References

External links

Airliner accidents and incidents caused by pilot error
Airliner accidents and incidents caused by weather
Aviation accidents and incidents in 1989
Aviation accidents and incidents in Cuba
Accidents and incidents involving the Ilyushin Il-62
1989 in Cuba
1989 meteorology
9046
September 1989 events in North America